Otto Wilhelm Slätis (3 August 1864, Lapinjärvi - 12 October 1940) was a Finnish agronomist and politician. He was a member of the Parliament of Finland from 1907 to 1908, representing the Swedish People's Party of Finland (SFP).

References

1864 births
1940 deaths
People from Lapinjärvi
People from Uusimaa Province (Grand Duchy of Finland)
Swedish-speaking Finns
Swedish People's Party of Finland politicians
Members of the Parliament of Finland (1907–08)